John Newberry (born April 8, 1962) is a Canadian retired professional ice hockey player. He played twenty-two games in the National Hockey League with the Montreal Canadiens and Hartford Whalers. He registered four assists.

Newberry was born in Port Alberni, British Columbia.

Career statistics

Awards and honours

References

External links
 

1962 births
AHCA Division I men's ice hockey All-Americans
Binghamton Whalers players
Canadian expatriate ice hockey players in Sweden
Canadian ice hockey forwards
EV Zug players
Frölunda HC players
Hartford Whalers players
Ice hockey people from British Columbia
Living people
Moncton Golden Flames players
Montreal Canadiens draft picks
Montreal Canadiens players
Murrayfield Racers players
Nanaimo Clippers players
NCAA men's ice hockey national champions
Nova Scotia Voyageurs players
Örebro HK players
Oulun Kärpät players
People from Port Alberni
Sherbrooke Canadiens players
Victoria Cougars (WHL) players
Wisconsin Badgers men's ice hockey players
Canadian expatriate ice hockey players in the United States
Canadian expatriate ice hockey players in Finland
Canadian expatriate ice hockey players in Scotland
Canadian expatriate ice hockey players in Switzerland